Peninsular Arabic are the varieties of Arabic spoken throughout the Arabian Peninsula. This includes the countries of Saudi Arabia, Yemen, Oman, United Arab Emirates, Kuwait, Bahrain, Qatar, Southern Iran, and Southern Iraq. 

The modern dialects spoken in the Arabian Peninsula are closer to Classical Arabic than elsewhere. Some of the local dialects have retained many archaic features lost in other dialects, such as the conservation of nunation for indeterminate nouns. They retain most Classical syntax and vocabulary but still have some differences from Classical Arabic like the other dialects.

Varieties

Ingham and Holes both note the existence of two peninsular dialect groups:
 A southwestern dialect group that includes most of the dialects of South Arabia, stretching as far north as Al Bahah. Holes generalizes it to a "sedentary" or "peripheral" group that also includes dialects of historically sedentary populations on the Persian Gulf coast, such as Omani Arabic and Bahrani Arabic. These dialects share certain syntactic features with Modern South Arabian languages.
 A central-eastern dialect group originating in the center, that spread with the migration of Arab tribes. This group includes the dialects of most bedouin tribes in the peninsula, spanning an area extending from the Syrian Desert to the Empty Quarter. Its most notable examples are Najdi Arabic and Gulf Arabic.
The following varieties are usually noted: 
 Yemeni Arabic, displays a past conjugation with the very archaic -k suffix, as in southern Semitic languages. It has to be noted that the dialect of Aden has  >  as in Cairo.
 Hejazi Arabic, spoken in Saudi Arabia along the coast of the Red Sea, especially in the cities of Mecca and Jeddah. Strictly speaking, there are two distinct dialects spoken in the Hejaz region, one by the Bedouin rural population and another by the urban population in cities such as Jeddah, Mecca, Medina and Yanbu.
 Dhofari Arabic, Spoken in Dhofar in southern Arabia, spoken in Yemen, Oman, and the surrounding regions.
 Gulf Arabic (excluding Omani Arabic, Dhofari Arabic and Bahrani Arabic), spoken in the coast of the Persian Gulf.
 Bahrani Arabic, spoken in Bahrain, Eastern Saudi Arabia, and Oman.
The following table compares the Arabic terms between Saudi dialects of urban Hejazi and urban Najdi in addition to the dialect of the Harb tribe with its tribal area (Najdi and Hejazi parts) which shows a correlation and differences between those dialects:

See also
Modern Standard Arabic
Modern South Arabian languages

Footnotes

Bibliography 

 

 
Languages of Saudi Arabia
Arabic languages
Mashriqi Arabic